The Broadcast Protection Discussion Group (BPDG) is a working group of content providers, television broadcasters, consumer electronics manufacturers, information technology companies, interested individuals and consumer activists. The group was formed specifically for the purpose of evaluating the suitability of the broadcast flag for preventing unauthorized redistribution (including unauthorized redistribution over the Internet of unencrypted digital terrestrial broadcast television (DTV)) and to determine whether there was substantial support for the broadcast flag. The group completed its mission with the release of the BPDG Report.

The BPDG has reached a consensus on the use of a technical broadcast flag standard for digital broadcast copy protection. The broadcast flag is an electronic marker embedded in over-the-air digital broadcast signals that would block or limit the ability of consumer electronics devices to make copies of the programs. The broadcast flag would also prevent the redistribution of such programs over the Internet. Despite reaching a consensus on this standard, the BPDG did not reach any agreement concerning how to implement the use of the flag or enforce it.

Digital TV programs protection using broadcast flags 

The group proposed that digital TV programs be embedded with a "broadcast flag." All digital devices would be required to recognize the flag, which would prevent the protected content from being distributed on the Internet. The report states, "The proposed technical solution does not interfere with the ability of consumers to both make copies of DTV content, and to exchange such content among devices connected within a digital home network."

BPDG publications
After several meetings, the BPDG has published some reports in order to enforce the idea of the broadcast flag. Those publications are:
 BPDG Final Reportl
 Summary of EFF Report on BPDG
 Full EFF Report on BPDG
 Table A

What is EFF?
The Electronic Frontier Foundation (EFF) is a nonprofit group of passionate people-—lawyers, technologists, volunteers, and visionaries-—working to protect digital rights.

Blending the expertise of lawyers, policy analysts, activists, and technologists, EFF achieves significant victories on behalf of consumers and the general public. EFF fights for freedom primarily in the courts, bringing and defending lawsuits even when that means taking on the US government or large corporations. By mobilizing more than 50,000 concerned citizens through our Action Center, EFF beats back bad legislation. In addition to advising policymakers, EFF educates the press and public. Sometimes just defending technologies is not enough, so EFF also supports the development of freedom-enhancing inventions.

Policy group is not a CPTWG sub-group?
Several CPTWG (Copy Protection Technical Working Group) participants indicated at CPTWG's June 5 meeting that the "parallel group" or "policy group" is "not a sub-group of CPTWG or "not part of CPTWG".

Broadcast flag is not a watermark
Some recent press coverage of BPDG refers to the BPDG proposal as recommending a watermark in digital TV broadcasts. This is a misperception of the nature of the broadcast flag. (There is a distinct proposal called the broadcast watermark which was not discussed extensively within BPDG and is not part of the BPDG's published recommendations.)

A watermark is commingled directly with the signal it marks, and thereby alters the signal (ideally, in an imperceptible way). By contrast, the broadcast flag exists side-by-side with video content it marks.

Terms to describe the broadcast flag, rather than watermark, might include "bit", "indicator", "flag", "descriptor", "tag", "header field", or "notice". But use of "watermark" is sure to generate confusion, especially because watermark proposals distinct from BPDG do exist. Watermarking is likely to be a big issue soon in a public forum—but not as a part of BPDG's proposal.

Misconceptions about BPDG

An article by John Dvorak seems to contain a misconception: that the result of BPDG's work will be the obsolescence of current digital TV receivers. As Dvorak writes:

"it appears that the new copy-protection schemes being dreamed up by Hollywood will make every single HDTV set sold to date obsolete. And buyers of new sets are not being told about this situation in a dubious attempt to dump very expensive inventory."

What happened was that the Hollywood folks, who are just freaked over the possibility that we'll be copying HDTV movies, have promoted copy protection that requires the decode circuit to be built into the display, not into the set-top box. This requires the set-top box to send a signal to a connector that new HDTV sets will have. If you're thinking of buying an HDTV, don't, unless it has this connector and circuit-whenever they are finalized."

One view is that Dvorak has got the situation backwards. Old equipment will continue to work. This is because BPDG is not planning to encrypt broadcasts at all—merely to cause them to include a "broadcast flag", and to obtain legislation forcing all manufacturers to comply with its rules.

The result of this would be that old equipment would be better and more useful than new equipment. Not only would it work properly, but it wouldn't have been crippled by having to comply with the Compliance and Robustness Rules. This is to say that old equipment would be more functional, not less functional, than new equipment.

Alphabet soup

"BPDG wants the Federal Communications Commission (FCC) to mandate Digital Rights Management (DRM) for ATSC DTB receivers

In the body of this article, there are expansions for about 80 of the most common acronyms used in discussions about this issue. (The acronyms expanded include every acronym which appears in the BPDG's Draft Compliance and Robustness Rules, among others.)

Of course, this it not enough to appreciate the context behind these acronyms. For example, knowing that PCMCIA stands for Personal Computer Memory Card International Association gives no clue that the Association in question published a standard for tiny removable cards used in laptops. Hearing that 8VSB means "8-level vestigial side band" explains nothing about 8VSB's role in digital television broadcasting (that is DTB for the initiated).

The following list contains some of the most important acronyms related to this subject:

 4C  4 companies
 5C  5 companies
 8/VSB  8 level vestigial side band
 AC3  audio code 3
 ADC  analog to digital converter, analog to digital conversion
 AGP  accelerated graphics port
 AHRA  audio home recording act
 ASIC  application-specific integrated circuit
 ATSC  advanced television systems committee
 BF  broadcast flag
 BPDG  broadcast protection discussion group
 BW  broadcast watermark
 CA  conditional access
 CBDTPA  consumer broadband and digital television promotion act
 CE  consumer electronics
 CEA  consumer electronics association
 CIG  computer industry group
 CMI  copyright management information
 CP  copy protection, content protection
 CPRM  content protection for recordable media
 CPTWG  copy protection technical working group
 CRT  cathode ray tube
 CSS  content scramble system
 D-VHS  digital VHS
 DAC  digital to analog converter, digital to analog conversion
 DMCA  digital millennium copyright act
 DRM  digital rights management
 DT  digital terrestrial
 DTB  digital terrestrial broadcasting, digital terrestrial broadcast
 DTCP  digital transmission content protection
 DTLA  digital transmission licensing administrator
 DTV  digital television
 DVD  digital versatile disc
 DVDCCA  DVD copy control association
 DVI  digital video interface
 ECM  entitlement control message
 EEPROM  electrically erasable programmable read-only memory
 EFF  electronic frontier foundation
 EIT  event information table
 EPN  encryption plus non-assertion
 FCC  federal communications commission
 FPGA  field-programmable gate array
 HRRC  home recording rights coalition

 IEC  international electrotechnical commission
 IF  intermediate frequency
 ISO  International Organization for Standardization
 IP  intellectual property
 IP  internet protocol
 IT  information technology
 LAN  local-area network
 LMI  license management incorporated
 MEI  Matsushita Electrical Industrial Corporation
 MPAA  motion picture association of America
 MPEG  motion picture experts group
 NAB  national association of broadcasters
 NCTA  national cable and telecommunications association
 NTSC  national television standards committee
 OOB  out of band
 OTA  over the air
 PAL  phase alternating line
 PC  personal computer
 PC  printed circuit
 PCI  peripheral component interconnect
 PCM  pulse code modulation
 PCMCIA  personal computer memory card international association
 PMT  program map table
 POD  point of deployment
 PSIP  program and system information protocol
 PVR  personal video recorder
 QAM  quadrature amplitude modulation
 RC  redistribution control [descriptor]
 RD  redistribution descriptor
 RF  radiofrequency
 SCMS  serial copy management system
 SCR  software-controlled radio
 SD  standard definition
 SDR  software-defined radio
 SI  system information
 SPDIF  Sony/philips digital interface
 SSSCA  security systems standards and certification act
 STB  set-top box
 TPM  technological protection measure
 TS  transport stream
 TSP  transport stream processor, transport stream processing
 TV  television
 VCR  videocassette recorder
 VHDL  vhsic hardware description language
 VOD  video on demand

What is Table A?

Many of the practical consequences of the BPDG proposal for consumers (and for competition in the marketplace) lie in a yet-to-be-written appendix to the specification. This appendix, called Table A, enumerates the kinds of digital outputs which are allowed on devices which can receive digital television signals.

The idea is that a device which receives a TV program with the broadcast flag set is not allowed to output the content of that program in digital form, except via a technology specifically mentioned on Table A.

This raises three questions: first, why should this be so? (What's wrong with letting device manufacturers choose for themselves what kinds of outputs their devices will have? If consumers want a particular kind of output, why shouldn't they have it? Why should legislation determine the capabilities of future digital televisions?) Second, what technologies will be permitted? Third, how is that decision going to be made?

The first question goes to the heart of the BPDG proposal and is addressed elsewhere (at least, by skeptics of BPDG; there has not been much in the way of a public defense of this mandate, which is being represented as a fait accompli in most circles).

The second and third questions are empirical matters. An earlier draft of the BPDG Compliance and Robustness Rules divided Table A into Authorized Digital Outputs and Authorized Digital Removable Media Recording Methods. The two Authorized Outputs mentioned were Digital Transmission Content Protection (DTCP) and High-bandwidth Digital Content Protection (HDCP); the two Recording Methods mentioned were Content Protection for Recordable Media (CPRM) and D-VHS.

DTCP is a copy-control scheme for digital video devised by five companies (called the "5C consortium"). HDCP is a similar copy-control scheme devices by only four companies (the "4C consortium"). Both of these schemes restrict what a consumer can do with digital video; both require a license if a device manufacturer is going to be able to implement them; both constrain the functionality of products in which they are incorporated. Both cost money to implement—the licenses are not free. DTCP encrypts video transmitted over a digital bus called IEEE 1394 (or "FireWire"). HDCP encrypts video transmitted over a different—and video-specific—bus called Digital Visual Interface ("DVI"). The encryption, in both cases, is meant to "protect" the content against the consumer, and to restrict playback of the content to "authorized", licensed devices.

Content Protection for Recordable Media (CPRM) is an encryption scheme for recordable media which is also meant to prevent media from being played back in devices other than those licensed by the 4C consortium. D-VHS is a new digital videotape spec which—you guessed it—also prevents media from being played back, except in licensed devices.

So here the suggestion was that four particular copy-control technologies, all closed standards and all of which have "compliance and robustness rules" of their own, were to be permitted as outputs from digital television receivers; all other video standards, and all other recording media, were to be banned by default.

Since the BPDG was formed by companies from the 5C and 4C consortia, it is difficult to imagine that it would recommend that their technologies not be permitted. Subsequently, the specific technology list was removed from Table A; the current discussion draft from BPDG does not contain any specific technologies at all, though it still bans "unauthorized" technologies by default. But now Table A has been left blank, and a discussion has begun about a proper procedure for choosing technologies to be added. (This shift took place as a result of a discussion at the last BPDG in-person meeting in Los Angeles.)

All current proposals for filling in Table A seem to involve agreement by some number of major movie studios—that is, members of the Motion Picture Association of America (MPAA) -- and, perhaps, agreement by some number of major electronics companies or other corporations.  No agreement has been reached within BPDG, but various "vehicles" or "methods" for approving technologies have been suggested. These typically employ a formula such as "n% of Major Studios and m% of manufacturers". No studio proposal, has yet contemplated the possibility that technologies could be approved without any Hollywood sign-off. Thus, the discussion appears to be centered on choosing values for the percentages to be plugged into these formulas.

See also 
 Watermarking
 Bandera de transmisión

References

External links 
 Broadcast Protection Discussion Group home page
 EFF home page

Communications and media organizations based in the United States
Organizations established in 1977
1977 establishments in the United States